Che Rise and Fall is a documentary film created by Eduardo Montes-Bradley. The film was entirely shot in Cuba at the time Che Guevara’s remains were airlifted from Bolivia to Santa Clara the final resting place. The documentary features the testimonies of Guevara’s comrades-in-arms in Sierra Maestra, Congo and Bolivia, also with Alberto Granado with whom Guevara rode a motorcycle from Argentina on a trip that will end 16 years later in the jungles of Bolivia, an experience that was brought to the big screen on The Motorcycle Diaries. Che Rise and Fall begins with an account of Guevara's death in Bolivia in 1967, and fittingly ends with footage of the return of his remains for interment in a monument in Santa Clara's Revolution Square some 30 years later.

Che Rise and Fall explores an unorthodox approach to the myth of Guevara as a revolutionary icon. According to Lourdes Vázquez from Rutgers University Library, the film documents Guevara’s frustrated experience for the period spent fighting a in Congo's Revolutionary War as well as his sense of failure. The documentary includes original archival footage, original photographs taken by Ernesto Guevara in Mexico, and images from the ceremony of Guevara’s remains being brought to Santa Clara, originally included on the documentary "Che, a man of this world" (1998) directed by Marcelo Schapces.

Che: Rise and Fall premiered on National Geographic Channel on June 14, 2007 and has been released on DVD in the U.S., Germany, United Kingdom, Portugal, and Spain.

Production notes
The documentary is structured around the testimony of Guevara’s childhood friend Alberto Granado, and those of Alberto Castellanos, Enrique Oltuski, Argudín Mendoza, Enrique “Pombo” Villegas, all members of his elite military entourage of Che Guevara during his revolutionary incursions in Sierra Maestra, Congo, and Bolivia. Che: Rise and Fall, was shot in La Habana, Bolivia, and undisclosed locations in Africa. What seems to distinguish this documentary from other biographical attempts to capture the man behind the myth, is the fact that even though the filmmaker features a wealth of archival stills and film footage, it’s essentially an oral history, told by those who actually knew Ernesto Guevara. Filmed on Super 16mm. Aspect Ratio: 1.66:1 DVD | Release Date: July 13, 2006.

Festivals and academic projection

Che: Rise and Fall has been invited to participate at the 20èmes Rencontres Cinémas d'Amérique Latine de Toulouse, in France. The documentary is also listed by WorldCat as available at some fifty university and public libraries in the United States including the University of Virginia, National Defense University Library, Defense Intelligence Agency, Carnegie Library of Pittsburgh, Bucknell University, University of Pennsylvania Libraries, the College of New Jersey, Morehead State University, Ohio State University Libraries, Emory University, Dartmouth College Library, Université du Québec à Montréal, and Tulane University.

Notes

External links
 

2007 films
American independent films
2000s Spanish-language films
Documentary films about Che Guevara
Argentine documentary films
American documentary films
2007 documentary films
Films shot in Cuba
Films directed by Eduardo Montes-Bradley
2007 independent films
2000s American films
2000s Argentine films